Federal Directorate of Education (FDE) Islamabad  is a Pakistani government agency that oversees the public schools in the Islamabad Capital Territory (ICT).

FDE was established in 1967 as an attached department of the Ministry of Education.  It had been working under the administrative control of the Capital Administration & Development Division (CA&DD). Now FDE is run by the Ministry of Federal Education and Professional Training.

Functions 
FDE oversees 423 schools in ICT with over 220,00 students from prep to post-graduate level. It employs 9663 teachers and 4423 support staff.

Educational Institutions under FDE

Enrollment of Institutions

References

External links 
Federal Directorate of Education
(www.mofept.gov.pk

Pakistan federal departments and agencies
1967 establishments in Pakistan
Government agencies established in 1967